The FC Hennef 05 is a German association football club from the town of Hennef, North Rhine-Westphalia. Apart from football the club also offers handball as a second sport.

The club's greatest success has been to earn promotion to the tier four Regionalliga West in 2014 but they were relegated after just one season.

History
FC Hennef 05 was formed in 2005 in a merger of two local clubs, TuRa Hennef and FC Geistingen, two local amateur clubs of which TuRa had been the more successful.

The new club took up TuRa's place in the Landesliga Mittelrhein 1 from 2005, a tier six league while Geistingen, playing in the same league that season and relegated gave its place to the new club's reserve team. Hennef won the league in its second season and earned promotion to the Verbandsliga Mittelrhein but lasted for only two seasons before being relegated down again. The club made an immediate return to the Verbandsliga in 2010 after finishing runners-up in the Landesliga. After an eleventh-place finish in 2011 the club entered a more successful era, winning the league in 2012. It also won the Middle Rhine Cup that season and qualified for the first round of the 2012–13 DFB-Pokal where it lost to TSV 1860 Munich.

At the end of the 2011–12 season the German football league system saw some changes, among them the Verbandsliga Mittelrhein being elevated a tier and receiving Oberliga status. Hennef remained at this level rather than being promoted to the Regionalliga West and won the Oberliga in the next two seasons. In 2013 it declined promotion but took it up the following year, entering Regionalliga level football for the first time. It came last in the Regionalliga in 2014–15 and was relegated from the league.

Honours
The club's honours:
 Oberliga Mittelrhein
 Champions: 2013, 2014
 Verbandsliga Mittelrhein
 Champions: 2012
 Landesliga Mittelrhein 1
 Champions: 2007
 Runners-up: 2010
 Middle Rhine Cup
 Winners: 2012

Recent seasons
The recent season-by-season performance of the club:

With the introduction of the Regionalligas in 1994 and the 3. Liga in 2008 as the new third tier, below the 2. Bundesliga, all leagues below dropped one tier.

Key

References

External links
  Official team site
  Das deutsche Fußball-Archiv historical German domestic league tables

Football clubs in Germany
Football clubs in North Rhine-Westphalia
Association football clubs established in 2005
2005 establishments in Germany